Let's Dance may refer to:

Music

Albums
 Let's Dance (David Bowie album), released in 1983
 Let's Dance (Nikki Webster album), released in 2004
 Let's Dance! (Sharon, Lois & Bram album), released in 1995
 Let's Dance, an album by U'redu, featuring Magnifico, released in 1992

Songs
 "Let's Dance" (Benny Goodman song), 1935 song
 "Let's Dance" (David Bowie song), from the 1983 album Let's Dance
 Lets Dance (9th Creation song) "Lets Dance" (9th Creation song) from the 1977 album Superheroes
 "Let's Dance" (Nikki Webster song), from the 2004 album Let's Dance
 "Let's Dance" (Chris Montez song), 1962 single
 "Let's Dance" (Chris Rea song), 1987 single 
 "Let's Dance" (Five song), 2001 single
 "Let's Dance" (Vanessa Hudgens song), from the 2006 album V
 "Hot Stuff" (Let's Dance), by Craig David from the 2007 album Trust Me
 "Let's Dance", by The Balham Alligators from the 1987 album Balham Alligators
 "Let's Dance", by Miley Cyrus from the 2007 album Hannah Montana 2: Meet Miley Cyrus
 "Let's Dance", from the 2010 film StreetDance 3D
 "Let's Dance", by Shimica Wong from the 2013 film The Way We Dance
 "Let's Dance", by Hawk Nelson from the 2008 album Hawk Nelson Is My Friend
 "Let's Dance", by Sara Evans from the 2000 album Born to Fly

Film, television, and radio
 Let's Dance (radio), a 1934–35 NBC radio program
 Let's Dance (1950 film), a musical starring Betty Hutton and Fred Astaire
 Let's Dance (2007 film) (Faut que ça danse!), a French-Swiss film
 Let's Dance (2009 film), a Bollywood film
 Let's Dance (2019 film), a French film
 Dancing with the Stars, a dance competition TV program known as Let's Dance in Germany, Slovakia and Sweden
 Let's Dance (German TV series), the German version of Dancing with the Stars
 Let's Dance (Slovak TV series), the Slovak version of Dancing with the Stars
 Let's Dance (Swedish TV series), the Swedish version of Dancing with the Stars
 Let's Dance (UK TV series), a British fundraising competition
 Let's Dance (Australian TV series), 1957 Australian instructional series
 The Raccoons: Let's Dance!, 1984 TV special of The Raccoons

Other uses
 Let's Dance, a segment of 1theK Originals